Cynthia "Cindy" Ann Potter (born August 27, 1950) is an American former Olympic diver and diving color commentator.  She was a member of three Olympic diving teams, winning a bronze medal in the 3 m springboard in 1976.

Career

Diving 
An 11-time All-American, Potter won a record 28 national diving championships.  She was the U.S. outdoor champion in the 1-meter springboard from 1968 through 1977.  Potter was the 3-meter springboard champion in 1971 and 1972 and from 1975 through 1977; and took first in the platform competition in 1970 and 1971.  Indoors, she won 1-meter springboard titles from 1969 through 1973 and in 1976 and 1977, the 3-meter in 1969, 1970, and 1973.  Additionally, Potter was chosen as World Diver of the year in springboard competition in 1970, 1971 and 1972.

Potter was a member of the 1968, 1972 and 1976 U.S. Olympic diving teams.  She was selected to the 1980 U.S. Olympic diving team, but due to the U.S. boycott of the games that year, Potter was unable to compete. She was one of 461 athletes to receive a Congressional Gold Medal instead. In 1972, she placed seventh on the 3-meter springboard and 21st in the 10-meter platform partially due to a foot injury, and in 1976 Potter claimed a bronze medal in the 3-meter springboard.

In other international competition, Potter won a gold in the 3-meter springboard and a silver in the 10-meter platform at the 1970 World University Games, a bronze in the 3-meter springboard at the 1975 Pan American Games, and a silver in the 3-meter springboard at the 1978 World Championships.

In 1987, Potter was inducted into the International Swimming Hall of Fame.

Television
In the late 1980s, 1990s and 2000s, she served as color commentator for televised U.S. and international diving competitions, primarily for NBC Sports. Potter continues to provide color commentary for its Olympic diving coverage and served as an analyst for its coverage of diving at the 2008 Summer Olympics and diving at the 2012 Summer Olympics as well as the 2016 Rio and 2020 Tokyo Olympics.

Personal life
Potter graduated from Indiana University in 1973 with a degree in secondary education, and also received a graduate degree from the University of Arizona in teaching and teacher education.  Since retiring from diving, she served as diving coach at The Westminster Schools in Atlanta, Georgia until 2020, and has served as a diving coach at Southern Methodist University, and the University of Arizona.

See also
 List of members of the International Swimming Hall of Fame

References

1950 births
College diving coaches in the United States
Divers at the 1968 Summer Olympics
Divers at the 1972 Summer Olympics
Divers at the 1976 Summer Olympics
American female divers
Indiana Hoosiers women's divers
Living people
Olympic bronze medalists for the United States in diving
Pan American Games bronze medalists for the United States
Sportspeople from Atlanta
Sportspeople from Houston
Southern Methodist University faculty
University of Arizona alumni
University of Arizona faculty
Divers at the 1975 Pan American Games
Medalists at the 1976 Summer Olympics
World Aquatics Championships medalists in diving
Pan American Games medalists in diving
Universiade medalists in diving
Congressional Gold Medal recipients
Universiade gold medalists for the United States
Medalists at the 1970 Summer Universiade
Medalists at the 1975 Pan American Games
American women academics